Troude was a protected cruiser of the French Navy, the lead ship of the . The class was built as part of a construction program intended to provide scouts for the main battle fleet. They were based on the preceding , the primary improvement being the addition of armor to the conning tower. Troude was built in the 1880s and was completed in late 1890.

Troude spent most of the 1890s in the Mediterranean Squadron, and in 1897, she was transferred to the Levant Division. There, she briefly served as the divisional flagship and later took part in the international intervention in the Cretan Revolt in 1897–1898. By 1901, Troude was in reserve, but she was reactivated in 1903 for a tour with the Atlantic Squadron. She patrolled fisheries off the coast of North America in 1904 before returning to the Atlantic Squadron in 1905. She was struck from the naval register in 1907 or 1908 and thereafter broken up for scrap.

Design

Beginning in 1879, the French Navy's  (Council of Works) had requested designs for small but fast cruisers of about  displacement that could be used as scouts for the main battle fleet. The unprotected cruiser  was the first of the type, which was developed into the -type of protected cruisers after the  requested light armor protection for the ships. In total, six ships were ultimately ordered, three per class; all were very similar. All of the ships were ordered by Admiral Théophile Aube, then the French Minister of Marine and an ardent supporter of the  doctrine; proponents of the concept favored the use of cruisers to attack an opponent's merchant shipping instead of a fleet of expensive battleships.

She displaced  as designed. Her crew amounted to 200 officers and enlisted men. The ship's propulsion system consisted of a pair of compound steam engines driving two screw propellers. Steam was provided by five coal-burning fire-tube boilers that were ducted into two funnels.

The ship was armed with a main battery of four  30-caliber guns in individual pivot mounts, all in sponsons located amidships with two guns per broadside. For close-range defense against torpedo boats, she carried four  3-pounder Hotchkiss guns and four  1-pounder Hotchkiss revolver cannon. She was also armed with four  torpedo tubes in her hull above the waterline, two in the bow and two further aft, one per broadside. She had provisions to carry up to 150 naval mines. Above the deck, a cofferdam was intended to control flooding from battle damage.

Modifications
Troude underwent a series of alterations during her career, primarily focused on updating her armament. In 1893–1894, Troude had her cofferdam replaced by a layer of highly sub-divided watertight compartments that covered the entire width of the deck. A number of other changes were also carried out, including reinforcing the sponsons for the main battery guns, altering the sailing rig, and converting the main battery to quick-firing guns (QF). The latter consisted of converted M1881/84 pattern guns. After November 1895, the bow torpedo tubes were removed. Her sailing rig was reduced in 1902. The light armament was standardized to nine 47 mm guns by 1904, and the remaining torpedo tubes were removed.

Service history

The contract for Troude was placed on 16 August 1886 with the Forges et Chantiers de la Gironde shipyard in Lormont. She was laid down eleven days later, the first member of her class to begin construction. She was launched on 22 October 1888, was moved to Rochefort on 24–25 November for fitting-out, and was commissioned for sea trials on 6 December 1888. The ship's propulsion system proved to be troublesome during her trials, which lasted for more than two years. She completed trials on 18 December 1890, and was accepted by the French Navy in January 1891, though she was not placed in full commission for active service until 5 January. On entering service, she was assigned to the Mediterranean Squadron, the main French battle fleet, and she departed Rochefort on 15 February. 

Troude was refitted extensively between OCtober 1893 and May 1894. She took part in the fleet maneuvers that year, which began on 1 July and concluded on the 27th. She was assigned to "Fleet B", which along with "Fleet A" represented the French fleet, and was tasked with defeating the hostile "Fleet C", which represented the Italian fleet. 

She remained in the Mediterranean Squadron in 1896, and she took part in that year's maneuvers as part of the cruiser screen for the 3rd Division. The maneuvers for that year took place from 6 to 30 July. Troude initially remained with the active units of the Mediterranean Squadron in 1897. Later that year, she served as the flagship of Rear Admiral Édouard Pottier in the Levant Division at the start of the Cretan Revolt of 1897–1898. By 1898, the armored cruiser  had replaced Troude as the flagship, allowing the latter to return to France. Troude served in the North Atlantic Division in 1900, along with Amiral Cécille and Suchet. That year, she was placed out of service at Rochefort to be re-boilered; the work lasted until 1902.

In 1903, the ship was reactivated and assigned to the Atlantic Squadron, which had previously been amalgamated with the Northern Squadron. At that time, the unit consisted of Tage, Troude, and the protected cruiser . She operated as part of the Newfoundland and Iceland Naval Division in 1904 in company with the protected cruiser , which was tasked with patrolling fishing areas off the coast of North America. In 1905, she operated in the Atlantic Squadron with the armored cruiser  and the protected cruiser . On 1 July 1906, Troude was placed in the category of special reserve, and was struck from the naval register on 3 July 1907. She was placed for sale at Rochefort in 1907 or 1908 and thereafter broken up for scrap.

Notes

References
 
 
 
 
 
 
 
 
 
 
 
 
 
 
 
 
 

Troude-class cruisers
Ships built in France
1888 ships